John Edward Berg (April 5, 1949 – December 15, 2007) was an American actor. He was perhaps best known for his role in the film Star Trek: Nemesis (2002). Apart from acting, he held many jobs during his life.

Life and career
He appeared in several television roles, including Law & Order, The Practice, Passions, The Bold and the Beautiful, House, Boston Legal, NCIS, Monk and others. He had only one film credit, however, playing a Romulan senator in Star Trek Nemesis.

Berg committed suicide in his home by turning on a hibachi grill in his bedroom and succumbing to its carbon monoxide fumes. He was 58 years old.

Filmography

References

External links
JB The Voice – Official site

American male television actors
American male film actors
Male actors from California
Male actors from Los Angeles
Male actors from Texas
Suicides by carbon monoxide poisoning
Suicides in California
1949 births
2007 deaths
20th-century American male actors
2007 suicides